"I'm the Urban Spaceman" was the Bonzo Dog Doo-Dah Band's most successful single, released in 1968. It reached #5 in the UK charts. The song was written by Neil Innes—who won an Ivor Novello Award in 1968 for the song—and produced by Paul McCartney under the pseudonym "Apollo C. Vermouth". The B-side was written by Vivian Stanshall. A well-known staging of the song involves Innes performing solo while a female tap dancer performs an enthusiastic but apparently under-rehearsed routine around him. This skit originally appeared in a 1975 edition of Rutland Weekend Television, with Lyn Ashley as the dancer, and was more famously revived in the 1982 film Monty Python Live at the Hollywood Bowl with Carol Cleveland taking over the role.

Leeds indie rock band Cud performed an extremely fast version (1:07 long) for a 1989 Peel Session.  The recording appears on their albums Elvis Belt and BB Cudn't C.

References

External links
 Basic release information at Discogs.com

Songs about fictional male characters
1968 singles
Novelty songs
Bonzo Dog Doo-Dah Band songs
Songs written by Neil Innes
Song recordings produced by Paul McCartney
Liberty Records singles
Imperial Records singles
1968 songs